Girgenti is an Italian surname, deriving from the Sicilian name for the town of Agrigento in Sicily.

Girgenti may refer to:
 Paolo Girgenti (c. 1769 – after 1800), Italian painter of the late 18th and early 19th-centuries, active in Naples
 John Girgenti (born 1947), American state legislator
 Agrigento, the Sicilian city
 A zone in Siġġiewi in the island of Malta that also contains Girgenti Palace
 The Girgenti meteorite of 1853; see Meteorite falls
 Girgenti, village in the Italian comune of Pescorocchiano, Rieti Province, Central Italy.
 Girgenti House - a small estate in East Ayrshire, Scotland.

Italian-language surnames